The 1935 Carnegie Tech Tartans football team represented the Carnegie Institute of Technology—now known as Carnegie Mellon University—as an independent during the 1935 college football season. Led by third-year head coach Howard Harpster, the Tartans compiled a record of 2–5–1.

Schedule

References

Carnegie Tech
Carnegie Mellon Tartans football seasons
Carnegie Tech Tartans football